The Tairov OKO-1 (Opytno Konstrooktorskoye - experimental design section), was a passenger transport aircraft produced in the Ukrainian SSR in the USSR in 1937.

Development
Late in 1935 V.K. Tairov helped form the OKO (experimental design section) in Kiev. In 1937 the OKO-1 was completed as a six-seat passenger transport, with all wood construction, this single engined monoplane demonstrated good performance with state-of-the-art systems. Electrically driven flaps, pneumatic wheel brakes, trimmers on all the tail surfaces, heated cabin, lighting and instruments for night or blind flying, full sound-proofing and full GVF(civil air fleet) equipment were all incorporated. The performance of the aircraft in flight tests was regarded as excellent but, for unknown reasons, production was not undertaken.

Specifications (OKO-1)

See also

References

 Gunston, Bill. “The Osprey Encyclopaedia of Russian Aircraft 1875 – 1995”. London, Osprey. 1995. 

1930s Soviet airliners